Diane Marie Moyer, Ph.D. (born July 29, 1958 in Reading, Pennsylvania) is a former field hockey player for the United States women's team that won the bronze medal at the 1984 Summer Olympics in Los Angeles, California.

She graduated from La Salle University and is currently a professor in the psychology department at Cedar Crest College in Allentown, Pennsylvania.

References

External links
 

1958 births
Living people
American female field hockey players
Cedar Crest College faculty
Field hockey players at the 1984 Summer Olympics
Sportspeople from Allentown, Pennsylvania
Medalists at the 1984 Summer Olympics
Olympic bronze medalists for the United States in field hockey
American women academics
21st-century American women